Zulu English is a variety of English, spoken almost exclusively in South Africa among the Zulu. The variety is heavily influenced by the phonology and lexicon of the Zulu language.

Phonology

Devoicing of certain obstruents, particularly .

References

Bibliography

 

Dialects of English
Languages of South Africa